Michael Colreavy (born 24 September 1948) is a former Irish Sinn Féin politician who served as a Teachta Dála (TD) for the Sligo–North Leitrim constituency from 2011 to 2016.

He was the Sinn Féin spokesperson on Agriculture, Fisheries and Food from 2011 to 2016.

Born in Sligo, he moved to Manorhamilton in County Leitrim in 1981 where he now lives. He joined Sinn Féin in 1979 where he campaigned for the hunger striker and Anti H-Block candidate Joe McDonnell at the 1981 general election. He was a Branch Secretary of the trade union IMPACT. He served on Leitrim County Council for the Manorhamilton electoral area from 1999 to 2011.

He is an opponent of fracking in the Lough Allen basin citing environmental concerns.

He did not contest the 2016 general election.

References

1948 births
Living people
Irish trade unionists
Local councillors in County Leitrim
Members of the 31st Dáil
Sinn Féin TDs (post-1923)